Jiří Mucha (12 March 1915 in Prague – 5 April 1991 in Prague) was a Czech journalist, writer, screenwriter, author of autobiographical novels and studies of the works of his father, the painter Alphonse Mucha.

Life 
Born in Prague, he was working in Paris as a correspondent for Lidové noviny when Nazi Germany occupied the rest of Czechoslovakia on 15 March 1939. It was at this time he wrote the Czech libretto for Martinů's Field Mass. He returned to Prague briefly for his father's funeral in July of the same year but was able to return to Paris and later joined the newly formed 1st Czechoslovak Division in France in Agde. Following the fall of France, Mucha made his way to the United Kingdom, where he joined the Royal Air Force before becoming a war correspondent for the BBC.  He returned to Prague in 1945. In 1951 he was arrested by the country's Communist government for alleged espionage, and following the demands of the state prosecutor for the death penalty, he was ultimately sentenced to hard labor in the Jáchymov uranium mines. He was released from prison in 1955, allegedly due to the efforts of his wife Geraldine, but according to other records, it was due to his agreement to work for the State Security Police (StB). In 1989, following the Velvet Revolution, which brought down the communist regime, he became chairman of the Czech PEN club.  He died of cancer in 1991.

Family
His first wife was Czech composer Vítězslava Kaprálová (1915–40). His second wife was Geraldine Thomson-Mucha (1917–2012), a Scottish born composer who lived in Prague until her death on 12 October 2012. Mucha had two children: a son, John, now President of the Mucha Foundation, with his wife Geraldine, and a daughter, Jarmila Plockova, with Vlasta Plockova.

Painter Jaroslava Muchová was his sister.

Work 
 Za mořem (1932)
 Ugle a cesta na konec světa (1941)
 Most (1943)
 Problémy nadporučíka Knapa (1945) (first published in English)
 Oheň proti ohni (1947)
 Spálená setba  (1948)
 Skleněná stěna (1949)
 Válka pokračuje (1949)
 Čím zraje čas  (1958)
 Pravděpodobná tvář (1963)
 Černý a bílý New York (1965)
 Alfons Mucha (1965) first published as Kankán se svatozáří (published in English in 1966)
 Studené slunce (1967) (first published in English)
 Marieta v noci (1969)
 Llydova hlava (1987)
 .
 Věčná zahrada (1994)

Some of Mucha's novels are autobiographical, e.g. ,  – reflecting his experience of a life in Stalinist prison – and  – his recollections of his relationship with Czech composer Vítězslava Kaprálová and the life of a Czech émigré community in Paris at the dawn of the World War II.

Notes

Bibliography 
 Sarvas, Rostislav. "Hedvabny kanibal." Reflex 4 (1992): 30–34.
 Sleevenotes to Lloydova hlava. Prague: Mata, 1999.
 "Ustavni soud naridil znovu projednat Muchovo dedictvi." Mlada fronta Dnes, 9 November 2005.
 "Valecny denik Jiriho Muchy." Reflex 23 (2004).
 .
 .

External links 
 . A rare film document featuring Jiri Mucha.
 . 
 .
 , a version of IMDb database.
 .
 .
 .

1915 births
1991 deaths
Writers from Prague
People from the Kingdom of Bohemia
Czech male writers
Czechoslovak expatriates in France
Czechoslovak expatriates in the United Kingdom
StB
Burials at Vyšehrad Cemetery